Broadway Basie's...Way is an album by pianist and bandleader Count Basie and His Orchestra featuring performances of Broadway musical songs recorded in 1966 and released on the Command label.

Reception

AllMusic awarded the album 2 stars stating "On this often unlistenable set, the Count Basie Orchestra plays unimaginative arrangements of a dozen Broadway show tunes".

Track listing
 "Hello Young Lovers" (Richard Rodgers, Oscar Hammerstein II) - 2:05
 "A Lot of Livin' to Do" (Charles Strouse, Lee Adams) - 3:01
 "Just in Time" (Jule Styne, Betty Comden, Adolph Green) - 3:06
 "Mame" (Jerry Herman) - 3:14
 "On A Clear Day (You Can See Forever)" (Burton Lane, Alan Jay Lerner) - 2:42
 "It's All Right With Me" (Cole Porter) - 2:35
 "On the Street Where You Live" (Frederick Loewe, Lerner) - 2:48
 "Here's That Rainy Day" (Jimmy Van Heusen, Johnny Burke) - 3:22
 "From This Moment On" (Porter) - 2:40
 "Baubles, Bangles, & Beads" (George Forrest, Robert Wright) - 3:01
 "People" (Styne, Bob Merrill) - 2:33
 "Everything's Coming up Roses" (Styne, Stephen Sondheim) - 3:10
Recorded at Finesound Studios in New York on August 18, 1966 (tracks 1, 3, 5 & 7), September 7, 1966 (track 4) and September 8, 1966 (tracks 2, 6 & 8-12)

Personnel 
Count Basie - piano
Al Aarons, Sonny Cohn, Roy Eldridge, Gene Goe  - trumpet
Richard Boone, Harlan Floyd, Grover Mitchell - trombone
Bill Hughes - bass trombone
Bobby Plater - alto saxophone, flute 
Marshal Royal - alto saxophone, clarinet
Eric Dixon - tenor saxophone, flute 
Eddie "Lockjaw" Davis - tenor saxophone
Charlie Fowlkes - baritone saxophone
Freddie Green - guitar
Norman Keenan  - bass
Ed Shaughnessy - drums
Chico O'Farrill - arranger

References 

1966 albums
Count Basie Orchestra albums
Albums produced by Teddy Reig
Albums arranged by Chico O'Farrill
Command Records albums